The San Nicolás Station is a metro station along Line 2 of the Monterrey Metro. It is located near the IMSS Zone Hospital No. 6. The station was opened on 1 October 2008 as part of the extension of the line from Universidad and Sendero.  It is an elevated station built into the median of Mexican Federal Highway 85 where it intersects Benito Juárez Avenue. The station's original name was to be Juárez, but was changed to San Nicolás because of its location in the center of the city of San Nicolás de los Garza. The logo for the station depicts the church of the namesake Iglesia San Nicolás Tolentino.

References

Metrorrey stations
Railway stations opened in 2008